On 23 January 2018, at 13:34:50 Western Indonesian Time (06:34:54 UTC), an earthquake struck the Indonesian island of Java near the regency of Lebak. The earthquake was categorized as a strong and shallow earthquake.

Strong shaking were widely reported across Banten, Lampung, West Java, Central Java and Jakarta. The tremor in Jakarta was much harder than in other recent quakes. By the virtue of its distance from the Indo-Australian plate, the capital normally does not experience strong tremors. Two people were indirectly killed by the earthquake.

Damage and casualties 
Property damage was reported in West Java and Banten. In the Lebak and Sukabumi regencies, 2,760 and 3,669 buildings were damaged respectively. Two people died from heart attacks in Lebak and Sukabumi and 35 others were injured. The Depok city hall was damaged by the earthquake as well.

References

External links
 

2018 disasters in Indonesia
Earthquakes in Java
2018 earthquakes
Earthquakes in Indonesia
2018 in Indonesia
History of Java
Banten
January 2018 events in Indonesia